The external iliac vessels are:
 External iliac artery
External iliac vein